Eric Barroso Sánchez (born 4 October 1990) is a former Spanish professional footballer who played mainly as a left back.

Club career
He came to Nitra from San Fernando in summer 2013, and made his debut against Žilina on 11 August 2013.

External links
 FC Nitra profile

References

1990 births
Living people
Spanish footballers
Footballers from Las Palmas
Association football defenders
Chiclana CF players
CD San Fernando players
FC Nitra players
FC Tiraspol players
MFK Zemplín Michalovce players
Segunda División B players
Slovak Super Liga players
Expatriate footballers in Slovakia
Expatriate footballers in Moldova
Spanish expatriate sportspeople in Slovakia
Spanish expatriate sportspeople in Moldova